Hamilton Park is a neighborhood in Historic Downtown Jersey City, Hudson County, New Jersey, United States, centered on a park with the same name.  Hamilton Park is located west of Newport, north of Harsimus Cove, north and east of The Village and south of Boyle Plaza.  The Victorian age park is located between Eighth Street and Ninth Street and Hamilton Place on the west and McWilliams Place on the East.  Like the Van Vorst Park neighborhood to the south, this quiet park is surrounded by nineteenth century brownstones. The park underwent renovations completed in 2010.

Programs 

The park produces several events throughout the year, some of which include
 A Shakespeare in the Park series by the Hudson Shakespeare Company. The professional company produces one Shakespeare or classical show for each summer month.  This is paid for by the Hamilton Park Neighborhood Association and is free to watch
 Movies in the Park, a series of outdoor screening of 4 to 5 movies in the months of June or July thru October, paid for by the Hamilton Park Neighborhood Association and is free to watch
 Hamilton Park Festival – Takes place usually in early June of each year and is paid for by the Hamilton Park Neighborhood Association.
 Youth Festival – Takes place usually in June
 Weekly Farmers Market – Takes place every Wednesday, produced by the Hamilton Park Neighborhood Association
 Easter Egg Hunt - Takes place in April

See also

Harsimus Stem Embankment
The Horseshoe
The Lembeck and Betz Eagle Brewing Company
List of neighborhoods in Jersey City, New Jersey
National Register of Historic Places listings in Hudson County, New Jersey

References

External links

Neighborhood Association Website

Historic districts in Hudson County, New Jersey
Houses on the National Register of Historic Places in New Jersey
National Register of Historic Places in Hudson County, New Jersey
Neighborhoods in Jersey City, New Jersey
Parks in Hudson County, New Jersey
Houses in Hudson County, New Jersey
New Jersey Register of Historic Places
Squares in Jersey City, New Jersey
Parks on the National Register of Historic Places in New Jersey